Riverside School is an international school in Prague being both independent and non-profit.  It is a day school offering students aged 3–18 an international approach to education in the English language that opened in 1994.  The curriculum is based on the British National Curriculum and the Senior High offers IGCSE's and the International Baccalaureate (IB) Diploma Programme.  The co-directors are Al Falk and Graeme Chisholm. The school celebrated its 25th year of operation in 2019.

Accreditations and associations

Riverside School is Accredited by the Council of International Schools (CIS) and the New England Association of Schools and Colleges (NEASC) and is an accredited member of the Council of British International Schools (COBIS).

Riverside is a member of the European Council of International Schools, the Association of Christian Schools International and the Independent Schools Christian Alliance.

Riverside is an IB World School , offering English, English Language and Literature, Czech and self-taught Language A1; Biology, Chemistry, Physics, Environmental Systems and Societies, Sport Health and Exercise Science and Computer Science; Mathematics: analysis and approaches and Mathematics: applications and interpretation; Music, Theatre and Visual Arts; Geography, History, Psychology, Business and Management and Economics; English, Spanish, French and German Language B, Spanish and German ab initio.

External links

Official website
English schools
The good schools guide

Schools in Prague
Educational institutions established in 1994
International schools in the Czech Republic
International Baccalaureate schools in the Czech Republic
1994 establishments in the Czech Republic